Marcello Giordani (born Marcello Guagliardo; 25 January 1963 – 5 October 2019) was an Italian operatic tenor who sang leading roles of the Italian and French repertoire in opera houses throughout Europe and the United States. He had a distinguished association with the New York Metropolitan Opera, where he sang in over 240 performances from the time of his debut there in 1993. He founded the Marcello Giordani Foundation to help young opera singers.

Biography
Giordani was born on 25 January 1963 in the small town of Augusta, Sicily. His father, a former prison guard, was the owner of a major gasoline station in the town, and his mother was a housewife. He showed a talent for singing at an early age and took private lessons in Augusta as well as singing in a church choir. When he was nineteen, he quit his job in a bank. He studied voice first in Catania and from 1983 in Milan with Nino Carta. Giordani made his professional operatic debut in 1986 as the Duke in Rigoletto at the Festival dei Due Mondi in Spoleto. His debut at La Scala came two years later when he sang Rodolfo in La bohème. He went on to sing throughout Italy and Europe, and in 1988, he made his American debut singing Nadir in Les pêcheurs de perles with Portland Opera, a company with which he frequently appeared early in his career. Engagements with several other American opera companies followed, including San Francisco Opera, Seattle Opera, Los Angeles Opera and the Opera Company of Philadelphia. He performed at the Vienna State Opera first in 1992 as Sänger in Der Rosenkavalier by Richard Strauss, and appeared there in 14 roles in 72 performances. Giordani made his Metropolitan Opera debut in 1993 as Nemorino in a Parks performance of L'elisir d'amore opposite Maria Spacagna as Adina. His first performance on the actual stage at the Metropolitan Opera House was on 11 December 1995 as Rodolfo to Hei-Kyung Hong's Mimì with Carlo Rizzi conducting.

In 1994, vocal problems that begun to surface in the previous years became more acute. He began to retrain his voice with Bill Schuman in New York but did not cancel his engagements. In 1995 he sang Alfredo in La traviata at Covent Garden under Sir Georg Solti, whose guidance he credited as a great help in the rebuilding of his career. In 1997, Giordani again sang at Covent Garden under Solti (as Gabriele Adorno in Simon Boccanegra), in what turned out to be the final opera performances that Solti would ever conduct. His career at the Met, which had initially been sporadic, began to flourish. He sang over 240 performances with the company, in 27 roles, including the leading tenor roles in the Met's premieres of Benvenuto Cellini and Il pirata. He also sang in the Met's season opening performances in both 2006 (Pinkerton in Madama Butterfly) and 2007 (Edgardo in Lucia di Lammermoor), and on 18 September 2008, he was the tenor soloist in the Met's performance of Verdi's Requiem in memory of Luciano Pavarotti. A reviewer for The New York Times wrote that he sang Pinkerton "with full-bodied Italianate passion; warm, rich tone; and clarion top notes".

Amongst the other opera houses and festivals where Giordani performed during his career were the Opernhaus Zürich, Vienna State Opera, Opéra National de Paris, Gran Teatre del Liceu in Barcelona, Deutsche Oper Berlin, Houston Grand Opera, Maggio Musicale Fiorentino, Teatro dell'Opera di Roma, Teatro Regio di Parma, Teatro Regio di Torino, Teatro Massimo Bellini di Catania, Arena di Verona, the Verbier Festival, and the Festival Puccini in Torre del Lago. In August 2008, Giordani appeared in concert with Salvatore Licitra and Ramón Vargas in Beijing's Great Hall of the People during the first week of the 2008 Olympic Games. 2008 also saw his appointment as Artistic Director for Musical Events at Città della Notte, a new arts center near Augusta. In December 2008 he gave his first master classes there.

In 2010, Giordani created the Marcello Giordani Foundation to help young opera singers at the beginning of their careers. The first annual Marcello Giordani Vocal Competition was held in Sicily in 2011.

Giordani met his wife, Wilma, when he was singing in Lucerne in 1988. They married two years later. The couple and their two sons lived in New York and Sicily. Giordani died of a heart attack at his home in Augusta on 5 October 2019 at the age of 56.

Operatic repertoire

 Vincenzo Bellini
 Il pirata (Gualtiero)
 I puritani (Arturo)
 La straniera (Arturo)
 Hector Berlioz
 Benvenuto Cellini (Cellini)
 La damnation de Faust (Faust)
 Les Troyens (Énée)
 Requiem
 Georges Bizet
 Carmen (Don Jose)
 Les pêcheurs de perles (Nadir)
 Francesco Cilea
 Adriana Lecouvreur (Maurizio)
 Gaetano Donizetti
 La favorite (Fernand)
 La fille du régiment (Tonio)
 Lucia di Lammermoor (Edgardo)
 Lucrezia Borgia (Gennaro)
 L'elisir d'amore (Nemorino)
 Umberto Giordano
 Andrea Chénier (Chenier)
 Charles Gounod
 Faust (Faust)
 Roméo et Juliette (Romeo)
 Jules Massenet
 Manon (Des Grieux)
 Werther (Werther)
 Giacomo Meyerbeer
 Les Huguenots (Raoul)
 Jacques Offenbach
 Les contes d'Hoffmann (Hoffmann)

 Amilcare Ponchielli
 La Gioconda (Enzo)
 Giacomo Puccini
 Edgar (Edgar)
 La bohème (Rodolfo)
 La fanciulla del West (Dick Johnson)
 Madama Butterfly (Pinkerton)
 Manon Lescaut (Des Grieux)
 Tosca (Mario Cavaradossi)
 Turandot (Calaf)
 Gioachino Rossini
 Guillaume Tell (Arnold)
 Richard Strauss
 Der Rosenkavalier (Italian singer)
 Pyotr Ilyich Tchaikovsky
 Eugene Onegin (Lensky)
 Giuseppe Verdi
 Attila (Foresto)
 Don Carlo (Don Carlo)
 I vespri siciliani (Arrigo)
 Il trovatore (Manrico)
 La forza del destino (Alvaro)
 La traviata (Alfredo)
 Les vêpres siciliennes (Henri)
 Luisa Miller (Rodolfo)
 Requiem Rigoletto (The Duke)
 Simon Boccanegra (Gabriele Adorno)
 Un ballo in maschera (Riccardo)
 Ernani (Ernani)
 Riccardo Zandonai
 Francesca da Rimini (Paolo Malatesta)

Discography
Giordano made DVD recordings of complete operas, and recorded tenor recitals on CD, including:
 La bohème (Cristina Gallardo-Domâs, Elena Mosuc, Marcello Giordani, Michael Volle, Cheyne Davidson, László Polgár; Opernhaus Zürich Orchestra and Chorus; Franz Welser-Möst, conductor). Label: EMI Classics (DVD)
 La Gioconda (Lucia Mazzaria, Marcello Giordani, Alberto Mastromarino, Julia Gertseva, Lidia Tirendi, Michael Ryssov, Andrea Cortese, Valerio Saggi; Teatro Massimo Bellini di Catania Orchestra, Chorus, and Corps de Ballet; Donato Renzetti, conductor). Label: Kikko Classics (DVD)
 Madama Butterfly (Fiorenza Cedolins, Francesca Franci, Marcello Giordani, Juan Pons, Carlo Bosi; Arena di Verona Orchestra and Chorus; Daniel Oren, conductor). Label: TDK (DVD)
 Manon Lescaut (Karita Mattila, Marcello Giordani, Dwayne Croft, Dale Travis; Metropolitan Opera Orchestra and Chorus; James Levine, conductor). Label: EMI Classics (DVD)
 Steven Mercurio: Many Voices (Andrea Bocelli, Marcello Giordani, Rolando Villazón, Sumi Jo, and Gino Quilico; Prague Philharmonic Orchestra; Steven Mercurio, conductor). Label: Sony/BMG (CD)
 A Midsummer Night's Dream – Soundtrack (Marcello Giordani, Cecilia Bartoli, Renée Fleming, Roberto Alagna) Label: Decca (CD)
 Sicilia Bella (Marcello Giordani, tenor; Teatro Massimo Bellini di Catania Orchestra; Steven Mercurio, conductor). Label: VAI (CD)
 Tenor Arias (Marcello Giordani, tenor; Teatro Massimo Bellini di Catania Orchestra; Steven Mercurio, conductor). Label: Naxos (CD)
 Verdi: Jérusalem (Marcello Giordani, Roberto Scandiuzzi, Marina Mescheriakova; Orchestre de la Suisse Romande; Fabio Luisi, conductor). Label: Universal/Philips (CD)
 Viva Verdi A 100th Anniversary Celebration'' (Compilation – various artists). Label: Decca (CD)

References

External links

 
 Marcello Giordani Foundation marcellogiordani-foundation.org
 
 
 Official biography, Atelier Musicale Artist Management
 Reviews, articles, photos and list of future performances for Marcello Giordani on TheOperaCritic.com
Video
 Intervista al tenore Marcello Giordani Interview (in Italian) – Augusta, January 2008
 "Nessun dorma" from Turandot Marcello Giordani & Friends concert – Augusta, January 3, 2008
 "E vui durmiti ancora" Marcello Giordani & Friends concert – Augusta, January 3, 2008
 "Cielo e mar" from La Gioconda – Teatro Massimo Bellini, Catania, 2006
 "Amis, amis secondez ma vengeance" from Guillaume Tell – Opera Orchestra of New York, 2005
 Finale from Guillaume Tell (Thomas Hampson, Marcello Giordani, Hasmik Papian, and Gaele Le Roi) – Opéra Bastille, 2003
 "Sempre libera" from La traviata (June Anderson and Marcello Giordani) – Avery Fisher Hall, New York, 1997.
 Final trio from Faust (June Anderson, Marcello Giordani, and Jeffrey Wells) – Lincoln Center, New York, 1996
 Act I duet from La traviata (Carol Vaness and Marcello Giordani) – Royal Opera House, Covent Garden, 10 July 1995
 Sextet: "Chi mi frena in tal momento" from Lucia di Lammermoor (Renée Fleming, Dolora Zajick, Luciano Pavarotti, Marcello Giordani, Paul Plishka, and Haijing Fu) – Lincoln Center, 1991

1963 births
2019 deaths
People from Augusta, Sicily
Italian operatic tenors
20th-century Italian  male opera singers
21st-century Italian male opera singers